Shilipu Town is a town located in the Miyun District of Beijing, China. Situated along the China National Highway 101, it shares border with Xitiangezhuang and Miyun Towns in its north, Guoyuan Subdistrict and Henanzhai Town in its east, and Beifang Town in its southwest. As of 2020, it had 29,824 people residing under its administration.

Its name Shilipu is derived from the fact that the village which the town was named after was ten Chinese miles away from the county's government building during the Qing dynasty.

History

Administrative divisions 
As of 2021, Shilipu Town was divided into 17 subdivisions, more specifically 5 communities and 12 villages. They are, by the order of the 2021 Administrative Division Codes:

See also 
 List of township-level divisions of Beijing

References

Miyun District
Towns in Beijing